Franciszek Brożek (23 August 1890 – 1940) was a Polish sports shooter. He competed in the team free rifle event at the 1924 Summer Olympics. He was captured by the Soviets during World War II and shot in the NKVD buildings in Kharkiv in the spring of 1940.

References

External links
 

1890 births
1940 deaths
Polish male sport shooters
Olympic shooters of Poland
Shooters at the 1924 Summer Olympics
Sportspeople from Kraków
Polish Austro-Hungarians
Polish military personnel killed in World War II
People executed by the Soviet Union by firearm
20th-century Polish people